Deep Roots is a studio album by Steven Curtis Chapman. Chapman alongside Cracker Barrel released the album on March 11, 2013.

Background and recording
The album was recorded at Beech Street Studios by Brent King and mixed by him along with Sean Moffitt, while the album was mastered by Brad Blackwood from Euphonic Masters. The album has performances by his father, Herb Chapman Sr. and his brother Herb Chapman Jr. alongside ones from his eldest son, Caleb Chapman from Colony House, and his daughter-in-law, Jillian Edwards Chapman, who is married to his son, Will Chapman. The gospel music and bluegrass music legend Ricky Skaggs performs on this album.

Critical reception

Reviewing the album from Country Weekly, David Guy replies, "For the gospel and contemporary Christian fan, this album will be uplifting and a welcome addition to the catalog of a prolific artist." Mark Rice writes, "the album is a joy to listen to". John DiBiase describes, "Deep Roots is a wonderful, under-the-radar release that gets back to the basics in a refreshing way; it's a palette-cleanser for today's often overly busy music and a great tool for intimate worship. Don't miss it."  Dawn Theresa states, "Deep Roots is more than just another hymns record – it's an artist reconnecting with his past and reminding us that hope and light are found in a deep-rooted faith." Jonathan Andre says, "A great purchase if you thoroughly enjoy the acoustic and bluegrass genre, this album is a great divergence from Steven, as he branches out into some new music. Well done Steven for a different, yet equally profound and welcoming album!"

Track listing

Personnel 
 Steven Curtis Chapman – lead vocals, acoustic guitar, banjo
 Gordon Mote – acoustic piano
 Bryan Sutton – acoustic guitar, banjo
 Brent Milligan – baritone guitar, bass, cello
 Dan Dugmore – dobro, steel guitar
 Rob Ickes – dobro
 Scott Sheriff – backing vocals 
 Jillian Edwards Chapman – lead and harmony vocals (2)
 Ricky Skaggs – lead and harmony vocals (3)
 Herb Chapman, Sr. – harmony vocals (5, 6), acoustic guitar (6), backing vocals (11)
 Herb Chapman, Jr. – harmony vocals (5, 6), backing vocals (11)
 Caleb Chapman – lead and harmony vocals (9)

Production 
 Steven Curtis Chapman – producer, arrangements (1, 3, 4, 5, 8)
 Brent Milligan – producer 
 Brent King – recording, mixing
 Sean Moffitt – mixing
 Brad Blackwood – mastering at Euphonic Masters (Memphis, Tennessee)
 Jim Houser – management
 Dan Raines – management
 Chris Hollo – photography
 Camille Blinn – photography
 Dena Divito – thanking

Chart performance

References

2013 albums
Steven Curtis Chapman albums